Geras is the god of old age in Greek mythology. Geras or Gera may also refer to:
 Geras, Austria, a municipality
 Geras Abbey, an abbey in Austria
Gera, Lesbos, a Greek town
 Norman Geras, political scientist
 Adèle Geras, children's author
 Geras (Mortal Kombat), Mortal Kombat character
 Geras or Gersa, old name of Jerash, in Jordan

See also
 Gera (disambiguation)